Lawsone (2-hydroxy-1,4-naphthoquinone), also known as  hennotannic acid, is a red-orange dye present in the leaves of the henna plant (Lawsonia inermis), for which it is named, as well as in the flower of water hyacinth (Eichhornia crassipes). Humans have used henna extracts containing lawsone as hair and skin dyes for more than 5,000 years. Lawsone reacts chemically with the protein keratin in skin and hair via Michael addition, resulting in a strong permanent stain that lasts until the skin or hair is shed. The darker colored ink is due to more lawsone-keratin interactions occurring, which evidently break down as the concentration of lawsone decreases and the tattoo fades. Lawsone strongly absorbs UV light, and aqueous extracts can be effective sunless tanning and sunscreens. Lawsone is a 1,4-naphthoquinone derivative.

Lawsone isolation from Lawsonia Inermis can be difficult due to its easily biodegradable nature. Isolation involves four steps:
 extraction with an extraction solution, usually NaOH
 column filtration using a macroporous adsorption resin
 a rinse with ethanol to remove impurities, and finally
 freeze the product to isolate the lawsone powder, usually a yellow colored dust.
During the rinse, the lawsone will be the bottom as it has such a high density and the chlorophyll molecules will all be on the top of the mixture.

Lawsone is hypothesized to undergo a reaction similar to Strecker synthesis in reactions with amino acids. Recent research has been conducted on lawsone's potential applications in the forensic science field. Since lawsone shows many similarities with ninhydrin, the current reagent for latent fingerprint development, studies have been conducted to see if lawsone can be used in this field. As of now the research is inconclusive, but optimistic. Lawsone non-specifically targets primary amino acids, and displays photoluminescence with forensic light sources. It has a characteristic purple/brown coloration as opposed to the purple/blue associated with ninhydrin.
Lawsone shows promise as a reagent for fingerprint detection because of its photoluminescence maximized at 640 nm, which is high enough that it avoids background interference common for ninhydrin.

Related compounds 
The naphthoquinones lawsone methyl ether and methylene-3,3'-bilawsone are some of the active compounds in Impatiens balsamina leaves. Juglone is a structural isomer used as a brown dye.

References 

Natural dyes
1,4-Naphthoquinones
Hydroxyarenes